Gioielli rubati– Alice canta Battiato is the seventh studio album by Italian singer-songwriter Alice, released in 1985 on EMI Music.

History
The album, whose title translates as Stolen Jewels – Alice sings Battiato, followed the highly successful 1984 single and Eurovision Song Contest entry "I treni di Tozeur", a duet with the composer. Gioielli rubati includes songs from Battiato's pop albums L'era del cinghiale bianco (1979), Patriots (1980), La voce del padrone (1981), L'arca di Noè (1982) and Orizzonti perduti (1983). "Luna indiana" ("Indian Moon"), loosely based on Beethoven's "Moonlight Sonata" and originally largely instrumental had new lyrics penned by Francesco Messina, partly spoken and partly sung by Alice. Just like the preceding single "I treni di Tozeur", the album prominently features strings courtesy of the opera house La Scala, arranged and conducted by classical composer Roberto Cacciapaglia.

The opening track "Prospettiva Nevski", minutely detailing a cold winter's day at Saint Petersburg's Nevsky Prospekt in the early 20th century, became Alice's best-selling solo single in Continental Europe and Scandinavia since her breakthrough with Sanremo music festival winner "Per Elisa" in 1981, and despite the fact that it originally was recorded by Battiato, it today counts as one of her signature tunes in Italy. Further single releases from the Gioielli rubati album include "Summer on A Solitary Beach", "Luna Indiana" and "Il Re del Mondo". Franco Battiato himself released the album Mondi lontanissimi the same year, which also included a new version of "Il Re del Mondo" as well as solo interpretations of "I treni di Tozeur" and "Chan-son Egocentrique", both previously recorded as duets with Alice.

A re-recorded version of "Prospettiva Nevski" with the London Session Orchestra was included in the 2000 career retrospective Personal Jukebox.

The Gioielli rubati album is not to be confused with the EMI budget compilation Alice canta Battiato which comprises material recorded between the years 1980 and 1987, released in 1997 after the artist had left the label and signed with Warner Music.

Track listing
Side A
"Prospettiva Nevski" (Franco Battiato) – 3:39
"Il Re del Mondo" (Franco Battiato) – 2:57
"Mal d'Africa" (Franco Battiato) – 2:56
Segnali di vita" (Franco Battiato) – 3:35
"Le aquile" (Fleur Jaeggy, Franco Battiato) – 2:55

Side B
"Summer on a Solitary Beach" (Franco Battiato) – 4:32
"Gli uccelli" (Franco Battiato) – 4:07
"Un'altra vita" (Franco Battiato) – 3:31
"Luna indiana" (Francesco Messina, Franco Battiato) – 3:22

Personnel
 Alice – lead vocals
 Aldo Banfi – computers, keyboards, drum machines
 Michele Fedrigotti – keyboards
 Orchestra della Scala di Milano (The La Scala Orchestra, Milan) – string instruments, woodwind instruments

Production
 Angelo Carrara – record producer
 Roberto Cacciapaglia – musical arranger, sound engineer
 Recorded at Studio Sette, Milan (February 1985)
 Franco Zorzi – sound engineer
 Mixed at The Power Station Studios, New York (March 1985)
 Jeff Friedriekson – sound engineer
 Francesco Messina – art direction
 Gik Piccardi – photography

External links

1985 albums
Alice (singer) albums
EMI Records albums
Italian-language albums